Simon Courcoul (born 28 December 1995) is a French professional rugby union player. He plays as a prop for the New England Free Jacks in Major League Rugby, previously playing for the Austin Elite, RC Narbonne and Aviron Bayonnais professionally.

References

1995 births
Living people
Austin Gilgronis players
Expatriate rugby union players in the United States
French expatriate rugby union players
French expatriate sportspeople in the United States
New England Free Jacks players
People from Laval, Mayenne
Rugby union props
Sportspeople from Mayenne